Nuria Párrizas Díaz was the defending champion but chose to compete at the 2022 National Bank Open instead.

Zhu Lin won the title, defeating Elizabeth Mandlik in the final, 6–2, 6–3.

Seeds

Draw

Finals

Top half

Bottom half

References

External Links
Main Draw

Koser Jewelers Tennis Challenge - Singles